"Heart" is a song by English synth-pop duo Pet Shop Boys from their second studio album, Actually (1987). It was released as the album's fourth and final single on 21 March 1988. The song topped the UK Singles Chart for three weeks in April 1988, becoming the duo's fourth and final chart-topper to date in the United Kingdom. The group had initially written the song for Madonna, though they never asked her to record it, instead keeping it for themselves.

Background
Written by Chris Lowe and Neil Tennant, "Heart" was the fourth and final single from the duo's second studio album, Actually. A new mix different to the album version was released as a single in March 1988, ascending to the top of the charts to become the duo's fourth—and, to date, last—UK number-one single. It was also successful across Europe.

The genesis of the song goes back to the sessions for the duo's first album Please in early 1986 with Shep Pettibone. Originally, the duo had planned to offer it to Hi-NRG singer Hazell Dean or—more notoriously—Madonna, but they ultimately kept it for themselves. The duo's version of the song was intended to be used in the Steven Spielberg-produced film Innerspace, but the dance sequence it was intended for was at the wrong tempo for the song. The song was originally called "Heartbeat", but was changed after Culture Club drummer Jon Moss announced the formation of a group named Heartbeat UK.

The lyrics are more traditional than most Pet Shop Boys songs, being a straightforward declaration of love—a characteristic common in many pop songs. On the commentary of the Pet Shop Boys' live video album Cubism, Tennant reveals that the "oh – ah – oh'oh ah" refrain which repeats throughout the song features the vocals of himself, Pavarotti and Wendy Smith (of Prefab Sprout).

The song was supposed to be called Heartbeat, but at the time Culture Club's Jon Moss had started a band with that name, so the name was changed to Heart.

According to Tennant they were inspired by the song I like it by Phyllis Nelson, which was produced by Shep Pettibone, who did a remix of Heart.

The song was re-recorded for Actually with producer Andy Richards, and was mixed by Julian Mendelsohn. The single remix is an edit of the Richards' version with the use of wah-wah guitar, giving the song more of a 1970s sound.

Despite topping the UK chart for three weeks and being a worldwide success, the duo themselves tend to dismiss it, with Lowe stating in 2001: "It just shows that chart positions aren't the be all and end all. 'Heart' isn't in the same league as 'Being Boring'." However, many fans regard the song highly and Pet Shop Boys like it enough to have performed the song on their 1989 tour, the Fundamental world tour in 2006 and 2007 as well as their Pandemonium tour in 2009–2010.

When included on the retrospective PopArt: The Hits collection, the album version of the track was used for the UK release rather than the hit single mix, the reason for this is unknown. The single mix was included on the US release.

Critical reception 
Johnny Dee from Record Mirror named the song Single of the Week, adding, "'Heart' is immediate modern, compact and remixed from the album, actually, it's what the kids want, it's what I want! This 45 contains every gimmick the Petties have toyed with since 'West End Girls'. Neil and Chris — you are the Marks & Spencer of pop music, the high street gods of the Eighties." The magazine's James Hamilton described the song as a "jittery tuneful Eurobeat throbber" in his dance column.

Music video 

Directed by Jack Bond, director of the band's 1987 film It Couldn't Happen Here, the music video for "Heart" is based on the 1922 film Nosferatu. The video opens with Tennant and his bride (Danijela Čolić-Prizmić) being driven to a castle (Mokrice Castle) with Lowe as his chauffeur. As he goes to bed with his bride, the vampire, played by Ian McKellen, spies them. Later, he seduces the bride and bites her. Finally, Lowe drives Nosferatu and his bride away, leaving Tennant to stare bitterly after them from a castle window. The video was shot in Mokrice Castle, Slovenia, then one of the Yugoslavia republics.

Track listings 
 7-inch: Parlophone / R 6177 (UK)
 "Heart" – 4:16
 "I Get Excited (You Get Excited Too)" – 4:53

 12-inch: Parlophone / 12 R 6177 (UK)
 "Heart" (disco mix) – 8:27
 "I Get Excited (You Get Excited Too)" – 4:53
 "Heart" (dance mix) – 6:08

 also released on cassette (TCR 6177) and CD (CDR 6177)

 12-inch: Parlophone / 12 RX 6177 (UK)
 "Heart" (12-inch remix) – 8:55
 "Heart" (dub mix) – 5:15
 "I Get Excited (You Get Excited Too)" – 4:53

Charts

Weekly charts

Year-end charts

References

Notes 
 
 Heath, Chris (2001). "Heart". In Actually / Further Listening 1987–1988 [CD liner notes]. London: Pet Shop Boys Partnership.
 
 

1987 songs
1988 singles
European Hot 100 Singles number-one singles
Irish Singles Chart number-one singles
Number-one singles in Finland
Number-one singles in Germany
Number-one singles in New Zealand
Number-one singles in Switzerland
Parlophone singles
Pet Shop Boys songs
Songs written by Chris Lowe
Songs written by Neil Tennant
UK Singles Chart number-one singles